"Kurihama" directs here. For the station, see Kurihama Station.

 is an area in the city of Yokosuka in Kanagawa Prefecture, Japan.

Kurihama is the location where Matthew C. Perry landed for his first negotiations for the opening of Japan on July 14, 1853. A large monument was erected in 1901 to commemorate the event, and a small museum was opened in 1987.

The Yokosuka Thermal Power Station is located at Kurihama.

See also
Japan – United States relations

References

Yokosuka, Kanagawa